Chaos is My Name is the debut album by the drone doom band Khlyst. Stephen Kasner did the artwork for the album.

Track listing

 "I" – 2:44  
 "II" – 7:50  
 "III" – 1:45  
 "IV" – 2:00  
 "V" – 3:53  
 "VI" – 7:13  
 "VII" – 6:16  
 "VIII" – 4:53

Personnel
Runhild Gammelsæter - voice
James Plotkin - guitar, laptop
Tim Wyskida - drums, gong

Personnel
Stephen Kasner - album artwork

References

2006 debut albums
Khlyst (band) albums
Hydra Head Records albums
Albums produced by James Plotkin